Helge Helgesen (27 September 1912 – 14 May 1992) was a Norwegian footballer. He played in one match for the Norway national football team in 1933.

References

External links
 

1912 births
1992 deaths
Norwegian footballers
Norway international footballers
Place of birth missing
Association footballers not categorized by position